The Samsung NX5 is an SLR-styled digital mirrorless system camera announced by Samsung on June 1, 2010. It was the second camera introduced that uses the Samsung NX mount for exchangeable lenses.

References
http://www.dpreview.com/products/samsung/slrs/samsung_nx5/specifications

Live-preview digital cameras
NX 5
Cameras introduced in 2010